National Route 435 is a national highway of Japan connecting Yamaguchi, Yamaguchi and Shimonoseki, Yamaguchi in Japan, with a total length of 73.8 km (45.86 mi).

References

National highways in Japan
Roads in Yamaguchi Prefecture